A pirate television station is a broadcast television station that operates without a broadcast license.  Like its counterpart pirate radio, the term pirate TV lacks a specific universal interpretation. It implies a form of broadcasting that is unwelcome by the licensing authorities within the territory where its signals are received, especially when the country of transmission is the same as the country of reception. When the area of transmission is not a country, or when it is a country and the transmissions are not illegal, those same broadcast signals may be deemed illegal in the country of reception. Pirate television stations may also be known as "bootleg TV", or confused with licensed low-power broadcasting (LPTV) or amateur television (ATV) services.

History
The apparently first pirate TV station in the US was Lanesville TV, active between 1972-1977 and operated by the counter-cultural video collective the Videofreex from Lanesville, New York. Another documented pirate TV station in the 1970s was Lucky 7, which broadcast for a single weekend in April 1978 from Syracuse, New York.

Techniques
There are several techniques for pirate TV broadcasting, most of which have been made very difficult, or obsolete, by better security measures and the move to digital television.

Relay hijack (analogue)
Many analogue relay transmitters would "listen" to a more powerful main transmitter and relay the signal verbatim. If the main transmitter ceases broadcasting (for example, if a station closes down overnight) then a pirate signal on the same frequency as the main transmitter could cause the relay to "wake up" and relay unauthorized programming instead. Typically this would be done by outputting a very weak RF signal within the immediate vicinity of the relay: for example, a video cassette recorder (such as a 12v system designed for use in trucks) sending its signal to a home-made antenna pointed at the relay. As the pirate signal is relatively weak, the source can be difficult to locate if it is well hidden.

A significant benefit of this attack is that the potential viewers do not have to re-tune their televisions to view the content. The content simply appears on an existing channel, after close-down.

This attack is generally now prevented by the channels broadcasting 24 hours per day (e.g. showing test cards instead of closing down), by using satellite feeds instead of repeating terrestrial signals, by electronic security to lock the relay to the authorised source, or by the switch to digital television.

Unsecured analogue satellite transponders have also been reported to have been hijacked in a similar manner.

Source hijack (analogue or digital)
In this scenario, a man-in-the-middle attack is performed upon the source material, such that authorized official transmissions are fed with unauthorized programming from the central studio or play-out facility. For example, a link feed (e.g. outside broadcast) is hijacked by a stronger pirate signal, or pre-recorded media (such as videotapes or hard drives) are swapped over for unauthorised content. This attack would generally have to be performed by an insider or by gaining access to studio facilities by social engineering.

Unauthorized transmitter (analogue)
As with most pirate radio stations, reasonably powerful VHF/UHF transmitters can be built relatively easily by any sufficiently experienced electronics hobbyist, or imported from a less strict country. The primary challenge to this technique is finding a suitable yet inconspicuous vantage point for the transmission antenna, and the risk of getting caught. If the pirate signal is strong enough to be received directly, it will also be strong enough to be tracked down.

Unauthorized multiplex (digital)
The advent of digital television makes pirate television broadcasting more difficult. Channels are broadcast as part of a multiplex that carries several channels in one signal, and it is almost impossible to insert an unauthorized channel into an authorized multiplex, or to re-activate an off-air channel. In order to broadcast an unauthorized digital TV channel, not only must the perpetrator build or obtain a VHF/UHF transmitter, they must also build or obtain, and configure, the equipment and software to digitally encode the signal and then create a stand-alone multiplex to carry it.

In Spain, in major provincial capital cities, usually operates one or more than one pirate TV digital multiplex. Some multiplexes started to operate after digital switch-over migrating pirate channels from analogue pirate television to DVB-T digital multiplexes.

Since shortly after digital switch-over and still today in secondary cities, some channels broadcast by means of a DVB-T transmitter with four analog input sources (in this case, four tuned satellite receivers connected by composite video cable) and then to amplifier, and digital signal is feed to antenna or tower. This method is the one used by most pirate TV channels. However, over the years and due to economic returns, some have begun broadcasting almost professionally. New equipment that they have been installing since three years ago allows remultiplexing of DVB-S programs into DVB-T multiplexes and most parameters can be configured at will.

Since 2010, its number has been increasing in Madrid and in Valencia, for example, and, as of March 2016, there are more than ten DVB-T pirate multiplex in Madrid metropolitan area transmitting without authorization with programming ranging from divinatory, esoteric and occult tarot or fundamentalist Christian to community television (which isn't regulated in Spain as of 2016).

In other countries, there are reports of pirate TV digital multiplexes, but they are very rare and usually suspected to have been false reports, mistaking overspill from authorized multiplexes in neighboring regions or nearby foreign countries. Viewing numbers may be much smaller than analogue pirate TV since re-tuning a digital television may be an entirely automated process which may ignore unauthorized multiplexes, or place such channels in an obscure section of the electronic program guide.

Stations

Known stations 
 beoutQ - Saudi Arabia. Started broadcasting after Qatar-based programs like beIN Sports were banned following the Qatar diplomatic crisis. Primarily airs sports programs.
 OèYAM SPORTS Marsa, Tunisia (the second headquarters is Paris) is a pirate project for Tunisian entertainment, sports and free broadcasting channels operating 24 hours a day, criminally with unofficial clients by Tunisian and Moroccan TV piracy, similar to the pirate channels BeoutQ, which I started to create on YouTube in 2022, which is A partner of the YouTuber Mondo Group and a Tunisian national TV, it also shows a sports match that has been pirated from the rights of beIN channels only and foreign and international programmes, series and films.
 Channel D - Dublin, Ireland (c. 1981)
 iStreetTV! - Palmers Cross, Jamaica, a project of !Mediengruppe Bitnik (2008) 
 Kanal X - Leipzig, Germany. Operated during the final days of the German Democratic Republic (East Germany).
 Lanesville TV - Lanesville, New York, United States. Operated on VHF channel 3 by the video collective Videofreex and broadcast on Saturdays from 1972 to 1977 (a total of 258 broadcasts). The collective and its station is detailed in Parry D. Teasdale's book Videofreex: America's First Pirate TV Station & the Catskills Collective That Turned It On.
 Lucky 7 - Syracuse, New York, United States. Operated during the evenings of April 14–16, 1978 on VHF channel 7
 NeTWork 21 - London, England -  Broadcast for around 30 minutes on Friday evenings in 1986
New Stations Broadcasting Network - New York City, New York, United States. Intermittent series of broadcasts in Brooklyn, New York beginning in 2007 created by artist James Case Leal. In New York operates on UHF channel 17, but is also responsible for television programming in other cities including Havana, Cuba (April 20, 2009 - May 22, 2009 Ch. 16),  Minneapolis, Minnesota during the RNC 2008 (Ch. 15), and Piedras Negras, Mexico (July 2008 Ch. 23).
 Northern Access Network - Canada, various locations in the late 1970s
 Nova TV - Dublin, Ireland (c. 1985)
 Odelia TV - Operated briefly in 1981 on UHF channel 58, offshore of Israel.
 Pirate Cat TV - Operated on VHF channel 13 by Pirate Cat Radio of San Francisco, California, United States
 Star Ray TV - Broadcasting on UHF channel 15 in the Beaches neighborhood of Toronto, Ontario, Canada
Telstar TV (c. 1984) Birmingham, United Kingdom. Broadcast for about eight weeks on the BBC2 transmitter in the Northfield and Rubery areas of Birmingham. Showed a mixture of films and pop videos after BBC2 closed at weekends and went unnoticed by the authorities for several weeks, much to their embarrassment.
 Telestreet - Italy - Movement that set up pirate TV micro-stations
 Thameside TV - London, England -  A very early pirate TV station set up by Thameside Radio. There were only two known broadcasts in December 1987.
 TV Noordzee - A 1964 TV station on VHF channel 11 which, along with Radio Noordzee (not to be confused with the later Radio North Sea International), broadcast from "REM Island", an artificial platform 6 miles offshore of Noordwijk in the Netherlands. Both of the stations were knocked off the air by a sea and air raid by the armed forces of the Netherlands.
TV Randers Syd - Randers, Denmark. Operated during 1981 and 1982. It was mostly broadcasting TV shows with music and entertainment recorded from German and Swedish TV channels and American movies. After two years of broadcasting the pirate was found in the suburb of Vorup and the station was closed by the authorities.
 TV Syd - A short-lived offshore TV station that broadcast on UHF channel 41. It was the sister station of Radio Syd and broadcast from the MV Cheeta 2 anchored off the Swedish coast.
Voice of Nuclear Disarmament - Operating in the 1960s and technically a radio station, it broadcast pre-recorded programs from high-rise rooftops in the Greater London area on the audio portion of BBC1's television frequency after the station signed off for the night. Programming consisted of interviews, announcements, folk songs, and field recordings.
WGUN - Mentioned in an article by Shannon Huniwell in Popular Communications magazine, this was a short-lived pirate station in the Lynchburg, Virginia area that broadcast on channel 45 during the late 1970s. The sole broadcast consisted of a water pistol with "WGUN 45 TV" in cut out letters mounted on a phonograph turntable with audio from "an unmercifully scratchy Baja Marimba Band album". The station was located by radio station technicians after being informed by the mother of a young viewer who found the station while tuning the UHF TV band. When asked, the young unnamed pirate stated he purchased the transmitter, an EMC Model TXRU-100 UHF transmitter, at a rummage sale from a church that had intended to start a UHF-TV station. Upon being informed that his broadcasts were illegal, the station was shut down. The transmitter was reportedly re-sold at a yard sale.
 W10BM - Morehead, Kentucky, United States - Originally a licensed LPTV station on VHF channel 10, it operated from 1998 to 2019 on a canceled license, making it a pirate broadcaster.

During the 1980s, large numbers of pirate TV stations operated in Italy, Greece, Spain and Israel. Subsequent legislation lead to the licensing of many of these stations and the closure of (most of) the remainder.

Proposed stations 
 Caroline TV - Advertised in 1970, this was to have been a project related to Radio Caroline, which at the time was off the air. Artwork showing the proposed station's identification graphics were released, but the station, which was to be broadcast from an airplane (similar to Stratovision), never materialized, although there are two website domains, called www.carolinetv.co.uk. And carolinetelevision.com
 City TV - Was to have broadcast from a decommissioned minesweeper offshore of England. Plans for the station were announced on 8 June 1965, and was to have broadcast on VHF channel 3, but the station never materialized. It is not to be confused with the later CityTV in Toronto and Vancouver, Canada, which began operation in 1972 and are fully licensed and legal full-power stations.
 Sealand Television - Was to have broadcast on Channel 28 from the Principality of Sealand, a micronation established on a World War Two gunnery platform off the coast of Essex, England. The station, which was announced to start in September 1987, was to have been financed by Wallace Kemper, who was facing fraud and conspiracy charges.
 Tower TV - Was to have broadcast from Sunk Head Fort, 14 miles offshore of Essex, England. Reportedly held a test transmission at 4:20 AM on Tuesday 9 November 1965. If this station had gone on air it would have probably caused interference with a legitimate transmitter at Peterborough on the same frequency.

Pirate television in popular culture

Movies
Movies often show Pirate TV channels simply "breaking in" over the top of existing channels, often all of them simultaneously.

 The American Way (1986) (also known as Riders of the Storm) - Disgruntled Vietnam War veterans operate S&M TV, a pirate TV station, from an airborne B-29 airplane.
Band Waggon (1940) - British film about a pair of out-of-work performers who are evicted from squatting on the roof of Broadcasting House (where BBC's studios were located). After moving into a supposedly haunted castle, they discover television transmission equipment used by German secret agents and use it to put on a show on the BBC's frequencies.
Batman (1989) - The Joker overpowers a TV signal to broadcast a commercial for his deadly "Smilex", a gimmick in keeping with his comics counterpart (see below). 
 Bedwin Hacker (2003) - A Tunisian woman hijacks TV signals as a form of political protest, broadcasting short text messages with pictures of a cartoon Camel. A French counter-intelligence (DST) computer expert attempts to track her down by way of a spy sent to infiltrate the hacker's social circle. Note this was several years before the Arab Spring. 
 Death Race 2000 (1975) - Political revolutionaries use broadcast signal intrusion to announce their plans to sabotage a transcontinental road race.
 District 13 (2004) - The protagonists force a Defense Secretary into admitting he was planning to detonate a neutron bomb, and the videotaped confession is broadcast via pirate transmission.
 Free Amerika Broadcasting (1981) - During a state of political upheaval in the USA, a group of rebels in Michigan set up a pirate television station.
 Hackers (1995) - One of the characters, Dade "Zero Cool" Murphy, hacks into a TV station's network feed and switches the programming to an episode of The Outer Limits. A fictional TV show, Hack the Planet, is shown on a pirate TV channel.
 Iron Man 3 (2013) - Crippled scientist Aldrich Killian covers up his illegal Extremis failures, which are 3000 °C explosions, by using broadcast signal intrusion to broadcast terrorist threats, which are performed by actor Trevor Slattery under the alias The Mandarin.
 The Pink Panther Strikes Again (1976) - Charles Dreyfus uses a broadcast intrusion to deliver his ultimatum to the world: kill Jacques Clouseau or be annihilated by laser. 
 RoboCop 3 (1993) - Dr. Lazarus and Nikko transmit over Mediabreak to tell the city about the goings-on in Cadillac Heights.
 The Running Man (1987) - Revolutionaries use broadcast signal intrusion to "detour" a popular TV game show.
 Serenity (2005) - Criminals with a sense of honor use a pirate television broadcast to expose a large governmental cover-up.
 Simon (1980) - A psychology professor, brainwashed by scientists as a prank to believe he is of extraterrestrial origin, attempts to reform American society by broadcasting his pronouncements with a high-power transmitter that overrides TV network feeds, becoming a national celebrity in the process.
 They Live (1988) - A group, seeking to warn the populace of an alien invasion, use broadcast signal intrusion on local TV programming.
 Used Cars (1980) - Feuding used car lot owners use broadcast signal intrusion to discredit each other.
 V for Vendetta (2005) -  The main character, a revolutionary named "V", hacks into the TV, broadcasting his plans all over Britain. The film has influenced many in real life to do the same.
 Videodrome (1983) - A TV technician discovers an encrypted pirate TV signal transmitting what appear to be snuff films.

Television
Al TV (1980s–90s) - Series of MTV specials hosted by "Weird Al" Yankovic, using his own pirate transmitter to take over MTV's signal to play unusual music videos and comedy bits.
Batman (1966–68) - In the episode "The Minstrel's Shakedown", the titular villain uses a broadcast signal intrusion to threaten the police and the stock exchange of Gotham City.
Channel Umptee-3 (1997) - Animated children's educational television series. The main characters operate a pirate TV station "located in the white space between channels".
Club Mario (1990–91) - A repackaged version of The Super Mario Bros. Super Show!. The new wrap-around segments had the hosts hijacking a TV signal to broadcast video of their antics, the Super Mario Bros. and Legend of Zelda cartoon shorts used in Super Show!, and redubbed clips from the short-lived Photon TV series.
Feral TV (1995–97) - Australian children's comedy television series. The main characters find an underground cable TV feed and use it to broadcast a pirate TV station.
Disney Club (Brazil) (1997–2002) - in the Brazilian version, later renamed to Disney CRUJ, the protagonists operate a pirate TV station.
Dark Angel (2000–2002) - One of the series protagonists, Logan Cale, operated a pirate television broadcast known as "Eyes Only" primarily to broadcast news reports, expose political/corporate corruption, issue public alerts, etc.
 Ed, Edd N Eddy (1999–2009) - In the episode "A Town Called Ed", the Eds use a pirate TV transmitter to inform the neighborhood kids of Eddy's roots as a founding father.
 Family Guy - On the episode "PTV", Peter Griffin, angered that authorities are censoring TV broadcasts, starts his own well-liked pirate TV station, PTV, containing deleted risqué scenes from movies and TV shows, partial nudity from TV programs and dogs mating.
 Green Acres - In the episode "How to Succeed In Television Without Really Trying", a Hooterville whiz-kid builds a pirate TV station in Mr. Douglass' barn. Mr. Douglass gets undressed in the barn, not knowing that he is now starring on TV in Hooterville. The FCC drops in to shut Mr. Douglass down, and he tries to deny the whole thing, but at the same time, Mr. Haney drives up with a rack full of men's underwear.  He tells Mr. Douglass that he needs some new shorts for his next undressing show.
 Max Headroom (1987) - One of the TV series' characters, "Blank Reg", runs Big Time Television, a pirate station, from a converted bus.
 Rock 'N' America was a 1984 US series in which Rick Ducommun played a VJ named Rick, who would play rock videos by "jamming into" existing TV channels. The character was relentlessly, but always unsuccessfully, pursued by an FCC agent. When the agent asked if Rick was doing it for a lark, Rick replied (via his illegal transmission) that his father had invented the system and offered it to the US military for jamming into Nazi propaganda broadcasts during World War II, but had been rebuffed.
 The Simpsons - In the episode "Sideshow Bob's Last Gleaming", Springfield is ordered by Sideshow Bob to shut down all its television stations or face nuclear devastation. Krusty the Clown refuses to comply with the demands and uses an abandoned Emergency Broadcast System transmitter to operate a pirate TV station and broadcast heavily improvised material.
 Torchwood (2006–11) - In "Children of Earth: Day Five," a pirate television station broadcasts footage of soldiers taking children to a rendezvous point on "Digital 141."

Music
 Flaunt It (1986) - The debut album by British band Sigue Sigue Sputnik was notable for containing paid advertisements between the tracks and in the liner notes, including one for London pirate TV station NeTWork 21.

Books
 The Moon Is a Harsh Mistress (1966) - In this science fiction novel, a self-aware computer helps revolutionaries by generating and broadcasting synthesized TV transmissions of their non-existent leader "Adam Selene" via an internal TV network.
 Mockingjay (2010) - This book, the third in The Hunger Games trilogy, describes the hacking of official government television broadcasts at several points in the novel, replacing them with calls to revolution, before the original broadcasts are restored by the government.

Comic books
 Batman villain the Joker often announces his crimes to Gotham City this way, in keeping with his theme as a showman. In the character's earliest appearances (including his debut in Batman #1 from the spring of 1940), he used radio broadcasts to this effect.
 American Flagg! (1983–1989) - A science fiction comic book series created by Howard Chaykin set in the early 2030s. A plot device in the story is Q-USA, a pirate TV station that broadcasts illegal sports, pornography, and movies and television shows made before the collapse of the pre-existing order .
 WRAB: Pirate Television (1985) A graphic novel by Matt Howarth and part of his Post Brothers story arc. An off-shore pirate television station operating in international waters interrupts satellite broadcasts with the intention of gaining a global audience.

See also 
 Broadcast signal intrusion—the intentional "hacking" into a licensed facility for broadcasting pirate television

References 

 
Broadcast law
History of television
Television terminology